The Ambrosini SAI.3 was a two-seat Italian touring airplane first flown in 1937.

Design and development
The SAI.3 was a low-wing monoplane with a graceful, elliptical wing, and fixed tailwheel undercarriage.  Customers could choose between enclosed or open cockpits, and between an inline Alfa Romeo 115 engine or a radial Fiat A.50.  A revised version was marketed as the SAI.3S with a smaller-chord wing and a Siemens-Halske Sh 14 radial engine, this offering far superior performance to the original SAI.3 design.

Specifications

References

 
 
 Авиация от A до Z (translated from: Donald. Aircraft of XX century)

SAI Ambrosini aircraft
Low-wing aircraft
Single-engined tractor aircraft
1930s Italian civil utility aircraft
Aircraft first flown in 1937